Stefania neblinae is a species of frogs of the family Hemiphractidae. It is known from the slopes of Pico da Neblina, in the Pico da Neblina National Park, on the border of Brazil and Venezuela. It represents the first record of the genus Stefania from Brazil. It is currently known only from Brazil but its range could extend into adjacent Venezuela.

References

neblinae
Endemic fauna of Brazil
Amphibians of Brazil
Frogs of South America
Amphibians described in 2010